Mike Gunther is an American film director and stuntman. He is known for being the second unit director on Transformers: The Last Knight (2017), Star Trek Beyond (2016) Teenage Mutant Ninja Turtles: Out of the Shadows (2016) in addition to Transformers: Age of Extinction (2014). At the end of 2011, he directed the feature film Setup starring Bruce Willis. During 2017-2019 Gunther developed and then directed the popular Netflix "Rogue Warfare" trilogy of films,  In 2020 he was the 2nd Unit Director for the Will Smith, Martin Lawrence blockbuster "Bad Boys For Life". 2021 found him serving as the Second Unit Director on "Shang-Chi and the Legend of the Ten Rings" for Marvel Pictures. Gunther also owns and operates 5150Action Productions, a film production company focusing on a wide slate of original content development.

Career 

After a career creating action sequences for films, Gunther developed and sold a slate of MTV shows: Live Free or Die Hard: Inside the Action (2007) Ghost Rider: Inside the Action (2007) Your Movie Show (2005–2006) and Underworld: Evolution – Inside the Action (2005) before directing the theatrical feature films Beatdown (2010) starring Danny Trejo and Rudy Youngblood as well as the Bruce Willis and 50 Cent action vehicle Setup (2011).

In 2014, he started second unit directing for the major studio franchises Transformers: Age of Extinction (2014)Teenage Mutant Ninja Turtles: Out of the Shadows (2016) Star Trek Beyond (2016) and Transformers: The Last Knight (2017).

In 2018, Gunther served as Second Unit Director on the Transformers spin-off Bumblebee for Paramount Studios as well as becoming a voting member of the Academy of Motion Picture Arts and Sciences by invitation.

In 2019 he was Second Unit Director for Sony Pictures on Bad Boys For Life starring Will Smith and Martin Lawrence.

In 2021 he was the Second Unit Director on "Shang-Chi and the Legend of the Ten Rings" for Marvel Pictures as well as "The Forever Purge" for Universal Pictures.

Filmography 
As Director / Writer / Producer

 Setup (2011) (Director, Writer)
 End of Watch (2012) (Associate Producer)
 Rogue Warfare (2019) (Director, Writer, Producer)
 Rogue Warfare: The Hunt (2019) (Director, Producer)
 Rogue Warfare: Death of a Nation (2020) (Director, Producer)
 A Violent Land (TBA) (Director, Writer, Producer)
 Stop Frank (TBA) (Director, Writer)
 Criminal (TBA) (Director, Writer)

As Second Unit Director
 Fighting (2009)
 Fast & Furious (2009)
 Transformers: Age of Extinction (2014)
 The Purge: Anarchy (2014)
 Sabotage (2014)
 Teenage Mutant Ninja Turtles: Out of the Shadows (2016)
 Star Trek Beyond (2016)
 Transformers: The Last Knight (2017)
 Tom Clancy's Jack Ryan (2018)
 Bumblebee (2018)
 Bad Boys for Life (2020)
 The Forever Purge (2021)
 Shang-Chi and the Legend of the Ten Rings (2021)
 The Lost City (2022)
 Ambulance (2022)
 Me Time (2022)

Awards 

 2010 World Stunt Awards – Won, Taurus Award – Best Stunt Coordinator and/or 2nd Unit Director: Feature Film for Fast & Furious
 2012 World Stunt Awards – Won, Taurus Award – Best High Work for Fast Five 
 2012 World Stunt Awards – Won, Taurus Award – Best Stunt Coordinator and/or 2nd Unit Director: Feature for Fast Five 
 2012 World Stunt Awards – Won, Taurus Award – Best Fight for Fast Five 
 2012 World Stunt Awards – Won, Taurus Award – Best Stunt Coordinator and/or 2nd Unit Director for Fast Five – Universal Pictures 
 2020 World Stunt Awards – Nominated Taurus Award – Best Stunt Coordinator and/or 2nd Unit Director for Bad Boys for Life – Columbia Pictures Entertainment 
 2021 Indiana Film Journalists Association – Nominated, IFJA Award – Best Stunt/Movement Choreography for Ambulance – Universal Pictures

References 

Living people
American film directors
American stunt performers
Year of birth missing (living people)